The 1968 Republican National Convention was held at the Miami Beach Convention Center in Miami Beach, Dade County, Florida, from August 5 to August 8, 1968, to select the party's nominee in the general election. It nominated former Vice President Richard M. Nixon for president and Maryland Governor Spiro T. Agnew for vice president. It was the fourth time Nixon had been nominated on the Republican ticket as either its vice presidential (1952 and 1956) or presidential candidate (1960).

Political context 

Former Vice President Richard M. Nixon, emerged as the frontrunner again for the 1968 Republican presidential nomination. Nixon had been the Republican Party nominee in the 1960 presidential election, and lost to Democratic Party candidate John F. Kennedy.

The so-called "New Nixon" in the 1968 presidential election devised a "Southern strategy," taking advantage of the region's opposition to racial integration and other progressive/liberal policies of the Democratic Party and President Lyndon B. Johnson.

Nixon decided not to re-select his 1960 running mate Henry Cabot Lodge Jr., and House Minority Leader Gerald R. Ford of Michigan proposed New York City Mayor John V. Lindsay for vice president. Nixon turned instead to another perceived moderate, Maryland Governor Spiro T. Agnew. Agnew, former Baltimore County Executive in the Baltimore City suburbs (1963–1967), and since Governor of Maryland, had come to Republican leaders and Nixon's attention when he summoned several Black civic, religious, and political leaders in Baltimore to the local State Office Building complex, following the disastrous April 1968 riots which enveloped Black sections of East and West Baltimore in the wake of the assassination of Martin Luther King Jr. in Memphis, Tennessee. Agnew complained of the Black leaders' lack of support after a number of what he perceived to be positive projects, programs and support by his Republican administration for the minority communities in the city. Agnew's biting comments caused many in the audience to walk out.

Nixon was nominated on the first ballot with 692 votes to 277 votes for Nelson Rockefeller, 182 votes for California Governor Ronald Reagan and the rest scattered. In his acceptance speech he deplored the state of the union: 

Nixon also said that he had "a good teacher", referring to Eisenhower, and made the delegates happy with the statement "Let's win this one for Ike!" Eisenhower was not present during Nixon's speech nor during any part of the convention. Due to failing health, he was under doctor's orders not to travel. He died the following March.

Balloting 
The following were placed into nomination:

Nominated for President

Nominated for Vice President

The Republican Convention Tally results 
This was the last time during the 20th Century that two siblings (the Rockefeller brothers) received votes at a convention.

Results by state 

The balloting by state was as follows:

See also 
 History of the United States Republican Party
 List of Republican National Conventions
 United States presidential nominating convention
 1968 Democratic National Convention
 1968 United States presidential election
 Richard Nixon 1968 presidential campaign
 1968 Miami riot

References

Bibliography

External links 
 Republican Party platform of 1968 at The American Presidency Project
 Nixon nomination acceptance speech for President at RNC (transcript) at The American Presidency Project
 Video of Nixon nomination acceptance speech for President at RNC from C-SPAN (via YouTube)
 Audio of Nixon nomination acceptance speech for President at RNC
 Video of Agnew nomination acceptance speech for Vice President at RNC (via YouTube)

Republican National Conventions
Republican National Convention
Republican National Convention, 1968
Republican National Convention
Republican National Convention
Republican Party (United States) events in Florida
Republican National Convention
Republican National Convention